The 2017 Milex Open was a professional tennis tournament played on green clay courts. It was the third edition of the tournament which was part of the 2017 ATP Challenger Tour. It took place in Santo Domingo, Dominican Republic between 14 and 19 August 2017.

Singles main-draw entrants

Seeds

 1 Rankings were as of 7 August 2017.

Other entrants
The following players received wildcards into the singles main draw:
  Roberto Cid Subervi
  Charles Force
  Nick Hardt
  José Olivares

The following player received entry into the singles main draw as a special exempt:
  Facundo Argüello

The following player received entry into the singles main draw as an alternate:
  Evan King

The following players received entry from the qualifying draw:
  Carlos Boluda-Purkiss
  Juan Ignacio Londero
  Jorge Montero
  Cristian Rodríguez

The following player received entry as a lucky loser:
  Kaichi Uchida

Champions

Singles

 Víctor Estrella Burgos def.  Damir Džumhur 7–6(7–4), 6–4.

Doubles

 Juan Ignacio Londero /  Luis David Martínez def.  Daniel Elahi Galán /  Santiago Giraldo 6–4, 6–4.

External links
 Milex Open at La Bocha

Milex Open
Santo Domingo Open (tennis)